Rev. George White (March 12, 1802 – April 30, 1887) was an Episcopalian preacher, amateur historian, and archaeologist in Georgia, United States.  In 1849 he published Statistics of the State of Georgia: Including an Account of Its Natural, Civil, and Ecclesiastical History Together with a Particular Description of Each County, Notices of the Manners and Customs of Its Aboriginal Tribes, and a Correct Map of the State.  His book entitled Historical Collections of Georgia: Containing the Most Interesting Facts, Traditions, Biographical Sketches, Etc., Relating to Its History and Antiquities, from Its First Settlement to the Present Time, has been widely referenced by scholars working with Georgia history since its publication in 1854.

References

Coulter, E. Merton (1936) "What the South Has Done About Its History," Journal of Southern History 2(1):3-28.

1802 births
1887 deaths
19th-century American Episcopalians
American archaeologists
American Episcopal priests
19th-century American historians
19th-century American male writers
People from Georgia (U.S. state)
Place of birth missing
Place of death missing
19th-century American clergy
American male non-fiction writers